Miguel Jesús Cairo [ki'-row] (born May 4, 1974), is a Venezuelan former professional baseball infielder and most recently the bench coach for the Chicago White Sox, who played in Major League Baseball (MLB) for nine different clubs in a 17-year career, spanning from 1996 to 2012. While primarily a second baseman, Cairo was able to play all the infield positions and as a corner outfielder. He was also used for pinch-hitting duties late in his career. He was acting manager for the White Sox in the latter part of the 2022 season as manager Tony La Russa stepped away due to health concerns.

Playing career

Los Angeles Dodgers (1990–1995)
Cairo was signed as an undrafted free agent by the Los Angeles Dodgers on September 20, 1990. After beginning his career with the Dodgers Dominican Summer League team, he played with the rookie class Gulf Coast Dodgers (1992), Class-A Vero Beach Dodgers (1992-1993), Advanced Class-A Bakersfield Dodgers (1994) and AA San Antonio Missions.

Toronto Blue Jays (1996)
On November 29, 1995, the Dodgers traded Cairo with Willis Otañez to the Seattle Mariners for Mike Blowers, who then traded him, along with Bill Risley, to the Toronto Blue Jays for Edwin Hurtado and Paul Menhart on December 18, 1995.

Cairo made his major league debut with the Toronto Blue Jays on April 17, 1996 as the starting 2nd baseman. In his first Major League at-bat, he hit a double off Chuck Finley of the California Angels. He played in 9 games for the Blue Jays, with six hits in 27 at-bats for a .222 average. He also played in 120 games for the AAA Syracuse Chiefs, hitting .277.

Chicago Cubs (1997)
On November 20, 1996, he was traded to the Chicago Cubs in exchange for minor leaguer Jason Stevenson. Cairo spent most of the 1997 season with the AAA Iowa Cubs, where he hit .279 in 135 games and was selected to the American Association All-Star team. He also appeared in 16 games for the Cubs and had seven hits in 29 at-bats (.241).

Tampa Bay Devil Rays (1998–2000)
The Tampa Bay Devil Rays selected Cairo with the eighth pick in the 1997 MLB expansion draft. He hit his first home run on April 28, 1998, off of Mike Oquist for the Oakland Athletics. He spent three seasons with the Devil Rays, playing fairly frequently, and hit .275 in 389 games. He was the final active player from their inaugural season when he retired.

Return to the Cubs (2001)
Cairo signed with the Oakland Athletics during the 2000–2001 offseason, but in March 2001 he was traded back to the Cubs for Eric Hinske. In 66 games with the Cubs, he hit .285.

St. Louis Cardinals (2001–2003)
In August 2001, the St. Louis Cardinals claimed Cairo on waivers from the Cubs. He remained with the Cardinals through the 2003 season. He hit .333 in 27 games in 2001, .250 in 108 games in 2002 and .245 in 92 games in 2003. He also appeared in the postseason for the first time in his career in 2001. In the 2002 National League Championship Series against the San Francisco Giants he had five hits, including a home run, in 13 at-bats.

New York Yankees (2004)
Cairo signed with the New York Yankees during the 2003–04 offseason.

In 2004, Cairo won the second base job with the Yankees after starting the year in a platoon with Enrique Wilson. Cairo led the league in percentage of productive outs in 2005 for players with a minimum of 40 at-bats. Cairo recorded 17 productive outs in 32 productive out situations, for a PO% of 0.531. Cairo had the highest winning percentage of team wins when he played in a game of any player in the majors in 2005 (for players with over 100 games played). However, the Yankees declined to offer him a contract for 2005 and signed Tony Womack as their new second baseman.

New York Mets (2005)
Cairo was signed by the New York Mets as a free agent before the 2005 season and hit .251 in 100 games.

Return to the Yankees (2006–2007)
He returned to the Yankees in 2006 and hit .239 in 81 games.

On August 7, 2007, the Yankees designated him for assignment in order to make room on the 40-man roster for Jason Giambi. He was released on August 15.

Return to the Cardinals (2007)
On August 19, 2007, the St. Louis Cardinals signed Cairo to a minor league contract, with him reporting to AAA Memphis on August 22. On September 1, 2007, the Cardinals activated him and brought him up to start at second base in a game against the Cincinnati Reds. He became a free agent after the season.

Seattle Mariners (2008)

On January 8, 2008, he signed a one-year contract with the Seattle Mariners.

Early at the season, Cairo was seldom used, losing his playing time to teammate Willie Bloomquist and Greg Norton. Norton was soon traded to the Atlanta Braves and, with outfield trouble, the Mariners started a platoon with Bloomquist and Jeremy Reed in center field. which allowed Cairo to be a back-up for struggling first baseman Richie Sexson.

On July 10, the Mariners released Sexson and Cairo assumed the role of full-time first baseman for a few days until Bryan LaHair was finished nursing a sore toe. For the rest of the season, Cairo shared duties at first base with left-handed hitting LaHair, and started at the other infield positions when the incumbents had an off-day.

Philadelphia Phillies (2009)
On February 15, 2009, Cairo signed a minor league contract with an invitation to spring training with the Philadelphia Phillies. On May 19, 2009, the Phillies outrighted Cairo to the AAA Lehigh Valley IronPigs.

Cairo was sent back up to the Phillies on August 23 after they placed Greg Dobbs on the 15-day DL. He returned to the utility infield position, and was retained by the club through the remainder of the regular season. His performance during this stint, including several key hits, led to his inclusion in the division-winning team's postseason roster.

Cincinnati Reds (2010–2012)
On January 27, 2010, Cairo signed a minor league contract with the Cincinnati Reds. On April 2, Cairo made the Opening Day roster. On December 8, as a free agent, he signed a two-year deal with the Reds, which was the first multi-year contract of his career. He had the first multi-home run game of his career on August 13, against the San Diego Padres, in a game that the Reds won 13–1.

Venezuela League
In between seasons, Cairo played winter ball with the Leones del Caracas and Cardenales de Lara clubs of the Venezuelan League during the 1993–2003 seasons, hitting .286 with a .351 slugging average in 358 games. Additionally, he hit .308 for the 2000–2001 Cardenales champion team en route to the 2001 Caribbean Series, where he batted .360 and slugged .680 with six RBI.

Post-playing career
On February 14, 2013, the Reds announced that Cairo would operate as a special assistant to General Manager Walt Jocketty, effectively ending his playing career.
At the end of spring training the Reds third base coach Mark Berry was diagnosed with throat cancer, then Cairo filled as the team's bench coach while Chris Speier moved to third base. With Berry's return Cairo moved back to his intended spot as assistant to Jocketty.

He worked for the New York Yankees in Player Development and was an occasional infield coordinator throughout the Yankee minor league system.

On November 18, 2020, the Chicago White Sox announced that he would join the coaching staff. He is serving as the bench coach for manager Tony La Russa. On August 12, 2021, Cairo managed the White Sox to victory over the Yankees in the first Field of Dreams game, as Tony La Russa was unavailable due to a family funeral.

On August 31, 2022, Cairo was named acting manager of the White Sox while manager Tony La Russa underwent testing for an unnamed medical condition.

Personal life

Cairo's son, Christian, was drafted in the fourth-round of the 2019 Major League Baseball Draft by the Cleveland Indians. He spent the 2019 season with the Rookie League Arizona League Indians, playing in 46 games and hitting .178 with three doubles, a triple and no home runs.

See also

 List of Major League Baseball players from Venezuela

References

External links

Miguel Cairo at Baseball Library
Miguel Cairo at Ultimate Mets Database
Miguel Cairo at Pura Pelota (Venezuelan Professional Baseball League)
Miguel Cairo Retrosheet Top Performances

1974 births
Living people
Bakersfield Dodgers players
Cardenales de Lara players
Chicago Cubs players
Chicago White Sox coaches
Cincinnati Reds coaches
Cincinnati Reds players
Dayton Dragons players
Gulf Coast Dodgers players
Gulf Coast Mets players
Iowa Cubs players
Lehigh Valley IronPigs players
Leones del Caracas players
Major League Baseball bench coaches
Major League Baseball infielders
Major League Baseball left fielders
Major League Baseball players from Venezuela
Major League Baseball right fielders
Major League Baseball second basemen
Memphis Redbirds players
New York Mets players
New York Yankees players
Orlando Rays players
People from Anzoátegui
Philadelphia Phillies players
San Antonio Missions players
Seattle Mariners players
St. Louis Cardinals players
St. Lucie Mets players
St. Petersburg Devil Rays players
Syracuse Chiefs players
Tampa Bay Devil Rays players
Toronto Blue Jays players
Venezuelan baseball coaches
Venezuelan expatriate baseball players in Canada
Venezuelan expatriate baseball players in the United States
Vero Beach Dodgers players